Aikea-Guinea is a March 1985 7" single and 12" EP by Scottish dream pop band Cocteau Twins, released on 4AD. The 7" featured two non-album tracks, while the EP added two more.

Release
Aikea-Guinea was included as a bonus with some Canadian pressings of Treasure. The title track also appears on the compilation The Pink Opaque (1985), and a remastered version appears on Stars and Topsoil (2000). On the 7", the song "Kookaburra" has a short percussive introduction that is not present on the EP. The EP was reissued in 1991 as part of The Box Set and again in 2005 as part of the Lullabies to Violaine compilation, this time with a remixed "alternate" version of the title track.

Meaning of the title
According to Robin Guthrie, the word "aikea-guinea" is a Scottish colloquialism for a seashell.

Track listing 
All songs written and produced by Cocteau Twins.
 "Aikea-Guinea" – 3:57
 "Kookaburra" – 3:19
 "Quisquose" – 4:10 (EP only)
 "Rococo" – 3:08 (EP only)

Personnel 
 Elizabeth Fraser – vocals
 Robin Guthrie – guitar
 Simon Raymonde – bass

Charts

References 

Cocteau Twins albums
1985 EPs
UK Independent Singles Chart number-one singles